SAIC Motor Technical Centre (also known as SMTC UK) is subsidiary of the Chinese automaker SAIC Motor via SAIC Motor UK Holdings. SAIC Motor also controls MG Motor UK for sales and distribution, but is independent of the technical subsidiary.

History
SAIC Motor UK formed when SAIC Motor bought out MG Motor from Nanjing Automobile in 2006.

SAIC Motor UK Technical Centre is a subsidiary of the SAIC holding company, and evolved from the Ricardo 2010 consultancy that was working with SAIC including devleping the Roewe models and helping production of the Rover KV6 engine in China. In 2007 it formally transferred into SMTC.

In 2019 there were large scale redundancies to the technical teams as SAIC downsized the SMTC in Longbridge.

Brands under SAIC UK
MG
Morris
Austin
Wolseley

Operations

Research and development

SAIC Motor UK was the major developer of MG and Roewe cars for SAIC. Its best known developed car is the MG 6.

References

External links
SAIC Motor UK—SMTC UK

SAIC Motor divisions and subsidiaries
Vehicle manufacturing companies established in 2006
Car manufacturers of the United Kingdom
MG Motor
British subsidiaries of foreign companies